Krishna Mandir is a temple in Barohiya, Uttar Pradesh, India. This is a temple of lord Krishna with Goddess Radha and Lord Shiva, Goddess Parvati, Lord Ganesh, Hanuman, and other gods.

The temple is situated at the north west corner of the village. Devotees believe that they can obtain what they want if they worship here. Janamastami is celebrated with enthusiasm here by villagers.

See also 

Nandmahar Dham

Krishna temples
Hindu temples in Uttar Pradesh
Maharajganj district